Cottage Court is a bungalow court located at 642–654 S. Marengo Ave. in Pasadena, California. The court consists of seven houses surrounding a narrow courtyard. The stucco homes were built in 1923 and designed in the Colonial Revival style. The designs feature gable roofs with wide eaves and recessed porches with supporting columns. The courtyard includes a walkway and two light poles.

The court was added to the National Register of Historic Places on July 11, 1983.

References

External links

Bungalow courts
Houses in Pasadena, California
Houses completed in 1923
Houses on the National Register of Historic Places in California
National Register of Historic Places in Pasadena, California
Colonial Revival architecture in California